The Ankobra River is primarily situated in Ghana. Its entire course is in south Ghana. Near its mouth are the remains of Fort Elize Carthago, a Dutch trading post abandoned in 1711,

The Ankobra River is fed by the Nini River. Several hydro electric schemes have been proposed for the upper reaches.

Mercury and arsenic was reported in 2003 to be found in the gold mining area of the Ankobra River Basin.

References

External links
 Ankobra River
 Ghana: Rivers and Lakes

Rivers of Ghana